Italy is a nation that has competed at the Hopman Cup tennis tournament on ten occasions. The nation's first appearance came at the 2nd staging of the event in 1990.

Players
This is a list of players who have played for Italy in the Hopman Cup.

Results

1 The two points gained by Italy in the 2002 tie against France came as a result of the female French competitor, Virginie Razzano's retirement in the singles and subsequent inability to compete in the doubles.
2 Italy did not play the mixed doubles dead rubber against Australia in 2003, defaulting the point.
3 In 2009, the male competitor from Chinese Taipei was unable to compete in either of his matches, thus defaulting two points to the Italians and contributing to the eventual 3–0 win for Italy.
4 Francesca Schiavone was forced to retire from her singles match against France in 2011 and was not able to compete in the mixed doubles, thus defaulting two points to the French.

References

Hopman Cup teams
Hopman Cup
T